

1980s 
The team was founded in 1985, and played 31 matched before the end of the decade.

1985

1986

1987

1988

1989

1990s 
The 1990s saw a surge of popularity with the team, introducing the first Concacaf Championships, Women's World Cups, Olympic Tournament, and Algarve Cups, all of which were won at least once by the US. The team became national heroes after winning the 1999 World Cup.

1990

1991

1992

1993

1994

1995

1996

1997

1998

1999

References

United States women's national soccer team results